Owusu is a both surname and given name in the Akan language. The name is originally from the Akan people of Ghana. Owusu is one of the most common Akan surnames or given names in Ghana. However, it is a real name; thus, there are both male and female versions. (male: "OWUSU" and female: "OWUSUA") which means "Strong-Willed and Determined" in Akan. It is the second most common surname in Ghana, with one in 80 people having this name. Notable people with the name include:

Akwasi Owusu-Ansah (born 1988), American football safety and wide receiver
Andrew Owusu (born 1972), Ghanaian athlete who competes in the triple jump
Basty Owusu Kyeremateng (born 1987), Italian footballer
Belinda Owusu (born 1989), British actress
Benjamin Owusu (1989–2010), Ghanaian footballer
Chris Owusu (born 1990), American football player
Collins Owusu, contestant on Deutschland sucht den Superstar (season 5)
Daniel Owusu (born 1989), Ghanaian footballer
David Owusu, English footballer
Edmund Owusu-Ansah (born 1983), Ghanaian footballer
Elsie Owusu, Ghana-born British architect
Ernest Owusu-Poku, former Inspector General of Police of the Ghana Police Service
Evans Owusu (born 1997), Ghanaian footballer
Francis Owusu (born 1994), American football player
Felix Owusu-Adjapong (born 1944), Ghanaian politician
Genesis Owusu (born 1998) a Ghanaian-Australian singer and rapper
Hackman Owusu-Agyeman (born 1941), Ghanaian member of parliament
Jeremiah Owusu-Koramoah (born 1999), American football player
Joshua Owusu (born 1948), retired Olympic track and field athlete from Ghana
Julian Owusu-Bekoe (born 1989), English-born football player
Kwesi Owusu (born 1950s), Ghanaian author and filmmaker
Lloyd Owusu (born 1976), professional footballer
Mercy Adoma Owusu-Nimoh (1936–2011), children's writer, recipient of a Noma Award honourable mention
Monica Owusu-Breen, American television producer and screenwriter
Nana Owusu-Nsiah, police officer and diplomat
Obed Owusu (born 1990), Ghanaian international footballer
Owusu Afriyie (born 1980), Ghanaian former professional footballer
Owusu Ampomah (born 1985), Ghanaian footballer
Owusu Benson (born 1977), Ghanaian football player
Owusu Hayford (born 1981), former professional footballer from Ghana
Owusu-Ankomah (born 1956), contemporary Ghanaian/German painter
Owusu-Ansah Kontoh (born 1992), Ghanaian football midfielder
Papa Owusu-Ankomah (born 1958), Ghanaian politician
Princeton Owusu-Ansah (born 1976), retired Ghanaian football midfielder
Quincy Owusu-Abeyie (born 1986), Ghanaian international footballer
Sandra Owusu-Ansah (born 2000), Ghanaian professional footballer
Victor Owusu (1923–2000), former Ghanaian politician and lawyer
William Owusu (footballer, born 1989), Ghanaian footballer
William Owusu (footballer, born 1991), Ghanaian footballer

See also
Ouassou

References

Akan given names
Surnames of Akan origin